Kincolith Water Aerodrome  is located adjacent to Kincolith, British Columbia, Canada.

References

Seaplane bases in British Columbia
Regional District of Kitimat–Stikine
Registered aerodromes in British Columbia